The Lumut Lighthouse, is an active lighthouse at Kampong Sungai Kayu Ara under the administration of Kampung Lumut II, Mukim Liang, Belait District of Brunei.

History
The lighthouse was inaugurated in March 2005. Sultan Hassanal Bolkiah paid a visit in 2006.

On March 2, 2020, the Ministry of Transport and Infocommunications, Member of the National Assembly (MMN) discussed about future plans which included being suggested to be opened as a tourist attraction. The topic was brought into spotlight due to MPABD's budget limitation. 

In commemoration of the International Maritime Organization (IMO) in November 2021, the lighthouse was among the five buildings that was lit up by the MPABD.

Location 
Located overseeing the Lumut Beach which caused the building stand out in the area. It is under the supervision of the Ports Department and the Marine Department before being transferred over to the Maritime Port Authority Brunei Darussalam (MPABD).

See also
 List of lighthouses in Brunei
 List of tallest lighthouses

References

2005 establishments in Brunei
Belait District
Tourist attractions in Brunei
Lighthouses in Asia
Towers in Brunei